Robert Buckley (20 April 1931 – 6 March 2013), known as Bobby Buckley, was an Irish Gaelic footballer who played for club sides Clounmacon and Kenmare Shamrocks and at inter-county level with the Kerry senior football team.

Career

Buckley first played Gaelic football with the local Clounmacon club. He first came to prominence when he lined out for the University College Cork team that won the Sigerson Cup in 1953. This success opened the door for Buckley to line out with the Kerry senior football team and he made his debut during the 1953 Munster Championship. He won the first of three successive provincial championship medals that year. After defeat by Meath in the 1954 All-Ireland final, Buckley claimed a winners' medal after lining out as a substitute in Kerry's defeat of Dublin in the 1955 All-Ireland final.

Honours

University College Cork
Sigerson Cup: 1953

Kerry
All-Ireland Senior Football Championship: 1955
Leinster Senior Football Championship: 1953, 1954, 1955

References

External link
Bobby Buckley profile at the Terrace Talk website

1931 births
2013 deaths
UCC Gaelic footballers
Kerry inter-county Gaelic footballers